Lofsdalen is a village and ski resort located in the district of Linsell  in Härjedalen Municipality, Sweden.

Lofsdalen is situated in the south of Härjedalen on the north side of Lake  Lofssjön.
In 1880, a  road  began to be broken between Linsell and Glöte, and the following year extended to Lofsdalen. From 1900 to 1901, a new highway was built between Linsell and Glöte. In 1931  the final stretch of road between Glöte and Lofsdalen was completed. In 1923, a road connection was made west to Högvålen.

Traditionality associated with  fishing and  hunting, Lofsdalen was developed during the mid 20th century as a ski destination offering  alpine skiing, cross-country skiing trails and downhill runs.

References

External links
 Lofsdalen website

Populated places in Härjedalen Municipality
Härjedalen
Ski areas and resorts in Sweden